Matthew Spacie (born 19 January 1967) is India-based British entrepreneur, humanitarian, and a former international rugby player. Matthew is the co-founder of Cleartrip, a global online travel company. He is also the former chief operating officer (COO) of the travel group, Cox & Kings Ltd. He is the founder of Magic Bus (also known as the Magic Bus India Foundation), a non-governmental organisation working with children and youth taking them from childhood to livelihood.

He has been accorded numerous accolades including Member of the Order of the British Empire and Business Standard Social Entrepreneur of the Year 2018.

Career
Born to an Army father in Cyprus, Matthew is a British citizen and currently lives in Mumbai, India, with his family. He attended boarding school in the United Kingdom. He first came to India in 1986 at the age of nineteen and worked as a volunteer with Mother Teresa's Missionaries of Charity organisation in Calcutta when he was just out of college.

Matthew returned to the UK, to pursue graduate studies in BA Humanities at the Nottingham Trent University and New York State University. Following his graduation and a number of management positions in the UK, Matthew was posted to India in 1996, as the chief operating officer of the travel group Cox & Kings Ltd. During his time at Cox & Kings, Matthew played rugby for the Indian national team and was awarded international rugby caps for India and playing in the World Cup Qualifiers in 2001. He spent much of his spare time practicing rugby at the Bombay Gymkhana. Outside his club, he observed a group of boys, hanging around its premises, watching the game with interest. He invited them into the club and began coaching them.

In 1999, Matthew founded Magic Bus with a group of street and slum-dwelling children from Mumbai. It was an opportunity for these children to engage in sports as a momentary relief from their day-to-day challenges. In 2001, Matthew resigned his job at Cox & Kings to focus full time on Magic Bus. He teamed up with an NGO named Akanksha with the intention of providing children a weekend break away from the difficulties of their everyday lives. Every fortnight he hired a bus taking the rugby boys to mentor younger children from local NGOs, to a hill station or the beach. The children started calling this the Magic Bus. At an early stage Matthew saw that using sport and good local mentors to intervene and influence young vulnerable people was an effective way to change behavior and move people from poverty.

Magic Bus is one of the largest non profits in India that leads the fight against poverty. Since its inception in 1999, Magic Bus has transformed the lives of more than one million children and young people and helped them move out of poverty through its childhood to livelihood programme.

In 2006, Matthew co-founded Cleartrip which is an online travel company rendering services across the globe.

Matthew was on the Global Advisory Boards of Etihad Airlines and currently sits on the board of DASRA.

Awards and achievements

Personal life
Matthew is married to Ashima Narain with three children. Matthew met Ashima in Mumbai. Ashima is a wildlife photographer and documentary filmmaker. She has shot documentary films titled The Last Dance and In the Pink.

See also
 List of social entrepreneurs
 Non-governmental organisations in India
 Shiv Nadar
 Shaheen Mistri
 Hanumappa Sudarshan

References

External links
 Matthew Spacie bio at Magic Bus
 The Social Entrepreneur Interview Series on Medium (website)
 Magic Bus

Living people
Indian social entrepreneurs
20th-century Indian businesspeople
Social workers
Ashoka India Fellows
Members of the Order of the British Empire
21st-century Indian businesspeople
People from Mumbai
Alumni of Nottingham Trent University
Indian humanitarians
1967 births
British emigrants to India
Indian rugby union players